Heterocrossa canescens is a species of moth in the family Carposinidae. It is endemic to New Zealand. This species has been observed in Aoraki / Mount Cook National Park and in the Southern Alps. The larvae of this species feed on the fruits and flowers of endemic to New Zealand species in the genus Gaultheria. Adult moths are on the wing in November and from January to March.

Taxonomy 
This species was described by Alfred Philpott in 1930 using material he collected in February at Governors Bush, Aoraki / Mount Cook National Park and originally named Carposina canescens. George Hudson discussed this species under that name in his 1939 book A supplement to the butterflies and moths of New Zealand.  In 1978 Elwood Zimmerman argued that the genus Heterocrassa  should not be a synonym of Carposina as the genitalia of the species in this genus are distinctive. Subsequently John S. Dugdale placed this species within the genus Heterocrossa. The holotype specimen is held at the Canterbury Museum.

Description 

Philpott described the species as follows:

Distribution 

This species is endemic to New Zealand. Other than the type locality, this species has been found in the Southern Alps at the junction of the Bealey and Waimakariri Rivers.

Biology and behaviour 
The adult moths of this species are on the wing in November and January to March.

Host species 

The larvae of this species feed on the fruits and flowers of Gaultheria species.

References

Carposinidae
Moths of New Zealand
Endemic fauna of New Zealand
Moths described in 1930
Taxa named by Alfred Philpott
Endemic moths of New Zealand